Vladimír Lánský is a former Czechoslovak slalom canoeist who competed in the 1950s and the 1960s. He won three medals in the C-2 team event at the ICF Canoe Slalom World Championships with a gold (1955) and two silvers (1959, 1961).

References

Czechoslovak male canoeists
Living people
Year of birth missing (living people)
Medalists at the ICF Canoe Slalom World Championships